Liotipoma dimorpha is a species of small sea snail with calcareous opercula, a marine gastropod mollusc in the family Colloniidae.

Description
The size of the shell varies between 4 mm and 5 mm.

Distribution
This marine species occurs off New Caledonia.

References

External links
 To World Register of Marine Species
 

Colloniidae
Gastropods described in 2012